Camps End is a hamlet near Castle Camps in Cambridgeshire, England.

References

Hamlets in Cambridgeshire
South Cambridgeshire District